Tomato ringspot virus (ToRSV) is a plant pathogenic virus of the family Secoviridae. It affects species of cucumber, tobacco, tomato, cowpea, among others. It causes ringspots in tobacco plants and raspberries, yellow bud mosaic in peaches, yellow vein in grapes, and stunted growth in gladiolus and Narcissus. Its range is in the temperate regions of North America, especially where its vector, Xiphinema americanum is present. Along with the adult and larval stages of this nematode, the virus is also spread by seed. This type of infection is more common in strawberries and soybeans than any other susceptible plant.

See also 

 Viral diseases of potato

References

External links
Descriptions of Plant Viruses: Tomato ringspot virus
Family Groups—The Baltimore Method
ICTVdB—The Universal Virus Database: Tomato ringspot virus

Nepoviruses
Viral plant pathogens and diseases
Tobacco diseases
Tomato diseases
Small fruit diseases
Stone fruit tree diseases
Viral grape diseases